Reverend Sir Leslie Boseto   (born April 17, 1933), a clergyman, was a member of the National Parliament of the Solomon Islands, from 1997 to 2010.

He lives on the island of Choiseul.

See also
Politics of the Solomon Islands

References

External links
Member page on Parliament website

1933 births
Living people
Knights Commander of the Order of the British Empire
Members of the National Parliament of the Solomon Islands
People from Choiseul Province